Fowlea melanzosta (common name Javanese keelback water snake) is a species of snake in the family Colubridae. It is found in Java and Bali, Indonesia. It is a common species typically encountered in rice fields, but it also occurs near lakes, rivers/streams, marshes, and grassland.

References 

Fowlea
Snakes of Southeast Asia
Reptiles of Indonesia
Endemic fauna of Indonesia
Taxa named by Johann Ludwig Christian Gravenhorst
Reptiles described in 1807